Meckling is an unincorporated community and a census-designated place (CDP) in Clay County, South Dakota, United States. The population was 48 at the 2020 census.

Meckling was laid out in 1873, and named in honor of Jones S. Meckling, a railroad employee.

Due to the large number of farms that grow the crop alfalfa it has become known as the "Hay Capital of the Universe". In this fertile Missouri River valley of southeastern South Dakota, alfalfa hay is the crop of choice. Each August Meckling and its neighboring town Gayville, the Hay Capital of the World host the Annual Hay Days.

In 1965, the local school closed, and the residents were allowed to choose between the Gayville or Vermillion school districts.  A couple of families, displeased with those choices, campaigned for an additional selection to be added: Wakonda.

Recently Meckling's zip code has been changed to Vermillion, SD's zip code of 57069.

Demographics

References

Unincorporated communities in Clay County, South Dakota
Unincorporated communities in South Dakota
Populated places established in 1873